The men's javelin throw at the 1962 British Empire and Commonwealth Games as part of the athletics programme was held at the Perry Lakes Stadium on Saturday 24 November 1962.

Mitchell won by  ahead of the defending champion, Englishmen Colin Smith and fellow countryman Nick Birks who won the bronze medal. Mitchell throw also set a new Games record, eclipsing the mark that Smith had set in Cardiff four years earlier.

Records

Final

References

Men's javelin throw
1962